Satan Junior is a 1919 American silent comedy film, directed by Herbert Blaché and John H. Collins. It was Collins' final involvement in film.  Collins began directing the film, production of which had to be suspended due to the flu epidemic of 1918.  Collins contracted the flu and died in 1918.  When production resumed, Blaché took over directing duties. It stars Viola Dana (Collins' wife), Milton Sills, and Lila Leslie, and was released on March 3, 1919.

Cast list
 Viola Dana as Diana Ardway
 Milton Sills as Paul Worden
 Lila Leslie as Marjorie Sinclair
 Frank Currier as Nathaniel Ardway
 Lloyd Hughes as Tad Worden
 George King as Juan-Kai
 Alice Knowland as Emmeline Ardway

References

External links 
 
 
 

Films directed by Herbert Blaché
Films directed by John H. Collins
Metro Pictures films
American silent feature films
American black-and-white films
Silent American comedy films
1919 comedy films
1919 films
1910s English-language films
1910s American films